Matías Tomás González (born 2 July 1999) is an Argentine professional footballer who plays as a forward for Deportivo Maipú, on loan from Godoy Cruz.

Career
González spent thirteen years in the youth system of Godoy Cruz. He was promoted into the first-team by manager Diego Martínez, with the forward appearing for his senior debut on 14 November 2020 in a Copa de la Liga Profesional home loss to River Plate at the Estadio Malvinas Argentinas.

In February 2020, González joined Deportivo Maipú on a one-year loan deal.

Career statistics
.

Notes

References

External links

1999 births
Living people
Place of birth missing (living people)
Argentine footballers
Association football forwards
Godoy Cruz Antonio Tomba footballers
Deportivo Maipú players
Primera Nacional players